Rudin is a Russian novel by Ivan Turgenev. It may also refer to:

People
 A. James Rudin, American rabbi
 Alexander Rudin (born 1960), Russian cellist
 Anne Rudin (1924–2021), previous mayor of Sacramento
 Cynthia Rudin (born 1976), American computer scientist and statistician
 Dan Rudin, American music producer
 Ernst Rüdin (1874–1952), Swiss psychiatrist
 Jack Rudin (1924–2016), American real estate developer
 John James Rudin (1916–1995), American-born Catholic bishop in Tanzania
 Lewis Rudin (1927–2001), American real estate investor
 Ken Rudin, American radio journalist
 Margaret Rudin (born 1943), American murder convict
 Mary Ellen Rudin (1924–2013), American mathematician known primarily for her work in topology
 Samuel Rudin (1896–1975), American real estate developer
 Scott Rudin (born 1958), American film producer
 Walter Rudin (1921–2010), American mathematician

Places
 Rudin, Koshkuiyeh, a village in Kerman Province, Iran
 Rudin, Rafsanjan, a village in Kerman Province, Iran